The Bowery House is an historic hotel on the Bowery in Manhattan, New York City, that mimics its former incarnation as a flophouse.

History
220 Bowery was designed by architect Jacob Fisher and built in 1924 in the Colonial Revival style after the property purchased by L Cohen & Sons that same year as a 4-story brick with stores on the ground floor and hotel. The property formerly housed a three-story building. The hotel first opened its doors as The Prince Hotel and accommodated 200 people. By the 1940s, in an era when the Bowery was known as New York City's "Skid Row," the hotel had been transformed to accommodate returning soldiers from World War II, down-and-outs and the down-on-their-luck as a flophouse. All of the floors were rebuilt with single room cabins, bunk rooms, and communal bathrooms to maximize occupancy. While these rooms were meant to be temporary lodging, guests of The Prince Hotel could indulge in all of the vices that the neighborhood provided and many of its occupants stayed on for extended periods of time.

The Bowery began gentrifying in the 1990s with new high-rise condominiums and upscale businesses. In 2000, Click modeling agency co-owner Joey Grill, purchased the building under AHJ Corporation for $2.2 million to create luxury lofts. New tenants were no longer taken and the upper floors were leased to Common Ground (now known as Breaking Ground), a nonprofit offering homeless services.

Hotel
In 2011, The Bowery House opened its doors after its redevelopment by Italian race car driver Alessandro Zampedri and American real estate entrepreneur Sanford Kunkel. On the second floors long-term residents rent the tiny stalls, six feet long by five feet wide. On the third and fourth floors house tourists.

Controversy 
There is concern that the tenants who remained on after the flophouse days, are being used as an attraction to artificially manufacture a nostalgia of the area in a more attractive way for high-end tourists.

References

External links
 The Bowery House
 The Bowery Kitchen
 Z/K Hospitality

Hotels in Manhattan
Bowery
Nolita